Cadams is an unincorporated community in Nuckolls County, Nebraska, United States.

History
Cadams had a post office between 1892 and 1940. The community was named for C. Adams, a banker from Superior, Nebraska.

References

Unincorporated communities in Nuckolls County, Nebraska
Unincorporated communities in Nebraska